Tuvalu competed at the 2015 Pacific Games in Port Moresby, Papua New Guinea from 4 to 18 July 2015. Nakibae Kitisane was the Chef de Mission. Tuvalu listed 101 competitors as of 4 July 2015. Four competitors qualified for two sports.

Tuvalu was ranked 19th at the Games, with 4 medals (1 gold - 0 silver - 3 bronze). Telupe Iosefa received the first ever gold medal won by Tuvalu at the Pacific Games in the powerlifting 120 kg male division.

Athletics

Tuvalu qualified 7 athletes in track and field:

Women
 Telesita Tusitala (Discus - best throw 25.81 metres - placed 6th)

Men
 Pouesi Kofe (Javelin -  best throw 44.96 metres - placed 9th)  
 Etimoni Timuani (100 metres - disqualified after false start in heat)
 Vaiuli Nukualofa
 Mafoa Perci Petaia
 Telito Filoimea Telito

Parasport
Men
 Iosefatu Joe Utime

Beach volleyball

Tuvalu qualified 4 athletes in beach volleyball. The women played in Pool A of the competition and lost all the games in the preliminary rounds. The men played in Pool A of the competition and lost all the games in the preliminary rounds.

Women
 Terokoraoi Ipitoa
 Taliu Tuimanuga

Men
 Tinifa Papamau
 Jackson Vailine

Boxing

Tuvalu qualified 5 athletes in boxing:

Men
 Harry Dave Eti Esela (Heavy-weight 82–91 kg Male - bronze medal)  
 Javin Kamtaura (Middle-weight 70–75 kg Male)
 Tapaeko Elisaia
 Patala Fagalele
 Maola Itiniua

Powerlifting

the Tuvalu Powerlifting Federation qualified 15 athletes in powerlifting:

Women
 Asenate Manoa (72 kg Female - TOTAL 340 kg - bronze medal)  
 Ela Lupeni (72 kg Female - TOTAL 310 kg - PLACED 4th)
 Teofoga Edueni Sonya Dabwido (84 kg Female - TOTAL 332.5 kg - bronze medal)  
 Susie Tulimanu (84 kg+ Female - TOTAL  375 kg - PLACED 5th)  
 Togafiti Eliko (84 kg+ Female - TOTAL  285 kg - PLACED 6th)

Men
 John Sauola Felemeni (74 kg Male - TOTAL 445 kg - PLACED 5th) 
 Nakibae Kitiseni (74 kg Male - third best bench-press and dead-lift but failed to complete the squat, meaning his final total was zero)
 Bernard Ewekia (83 kg Male - TOTAL 467.5 kg - PLACED 8th)  
 Ita Uniuni (83 kg Male - TOTAL 420 kg - PLACED 10th)
 Mark Loleni (93 kg Male - TOTAL 510 kg - PLACED 4th)  
 Fakataliga Ulisese (93 kg Male - TOTAL 490 kg - PLACED 5th)
 Telupe Iosefa won the gold medal in the 120 kg male division, with a squat lift of 337.5 kg (the best performance), he then produced a bench press of 182.5 kg, followed by a deadlift of 285 kg to achieve the total of 805 kg.  
 Tuau Lapua Lapua (59 kg Male - TOTAL 440 kg - PLACED 4th)  
 John Taani Anisani

Table tennis

Tuvalu qualified 11 athletes in table tennis. The women played in the team event but did not progress beyond the round-robin matches.  The men played in the team event but did not progress beyond the round-robin matches.  
 Brenda Christine Katepu
 Betty Resture
 Kaimalie Resture
 Alex Fred Resture
 Kalton Melton
 Tesika Peti
 Tulimanu Vaea
 Fakanaaga Manase
 Seluka Resture
 Sulami Resture
 Hililogo Toai

Taekwondo

Tuvalu qualified 2 athletes in taekwondo:

Men
 Faulufalenga Epu
 Sioota Makolo Pole

Tennis

Tuvalu qualified 4 athletes in tennis. They played in the team event but did not progress beyond the round-robin matches.

Men
 Saintly Alesi Moloti
 Felo Nai
 Tepanini Pita
 Isopo Sokomani

Touch rugby

Tuvalu qualified a men's team in touch rugby (16 players). The Tuvalu team won against Tonga 6-5 (touchdowns) in the first game; they were defeated by Cook Islands 11-3 in the second game; they won against Kiribati 11-2 in the third game; and in the final game of the round robin competition, Tuvalu was defeated by Solomon Islands 10-4. The team did not proceed to the semi-finals and ended up in 6th place in the competition.:

Men
 Nafa Eitini
 Iese Falaile
 Christopher Fatulolo
 Falegai Feagai
 Lasalo Kolokai
 Laijia Kuruisalili
 Tausau Lopati
 Tata Lousi
 Julian Niu
 Petelu Paisi
 Meauma Petaia
 Manatu Siose
 Elia Tavita
 Etimoni Timuani
 Lutelu Tanelua Tiute
 Tiaoti Maatia Toafa Toafa

Volleyball

Tuvalu qualified  men's and women's teams in volleyball (28 players). The women played in Pool A of the competition and lost all the games in the preliminary rounds.  The men played in Pool B of the competition and won the game against Nauru (3-2) but lost against Fiji, New Caledonia, American Samoa, Wallis and Futuna.

 Sally Atalulu Faleasiu
 Lilly Lafita
 Lillyvanu Maketi
 Masetapu Freda Junior Resture
 Lillian Tusitala
 Thomas Pati
 Tauati Elisaia
 Loluama Eti
 Matagimalie Evagelia
 Imo Fiamalua
 Eleni Ioapo
 Ikapoti Kaisami
 Foma Kalala
 Iefata Keli
 Afemai Lopati
 Valoa Lutelu
 Saili Melo
 Vaiaho Napoe
 Taulau Niusala
 Logovale Pola
 Nove Poloie
 Viiga Poutoa
 Valisi Sakalia
 Akinesi Sio
 Vili Tetoa
 Jay Timo
 Nisha Tusitala
 Sagalei Uila

Weightlifting

The Tuvalu Weightlifting Federation qualified 13 athletes in weightlifting. The Senior, Youth & Junior Oceania Weightlifting Championships 2015 were held same time as the Pacific Games weightlifting competition:

Women
 Lepeka Felieisi (Snatch 63 kg Female - best 50 kg - placed 7th equal) Participated in the Senior Oceania Weightlifting Championship 2015. Participated in the Junior Oceania Weightlifting Championship 2015. Participated in the Youth Oceania Weightlifting Championship 2015.
 Tigerina Joglina Telogo (Snatch 63 kg Female - best 50 kg - placed 7th equal) Participated in the Senior Oceania Weightlifting Championship 2015. Participated in Junior Oceania Weightlifting Championship 2015.
 Alieta Adrianne Kalakaua (Snatch 69 kg Female - best 50 kg - placed 6th) (Clean and Jerk 69 kg Female - best 65 kg - placed 6th) (TOTAL 115 kg - PLACED 9th) Participated in the Senior Oceania Weightlifting Championship 2015. Participated in the Junior Oceania Weightlifting Championship 2015. Participated in the Youth Oceania Weightlifting Championship 2015.
 Togafiti Eliko (75+kg Female - no successful lifts) Participated in the Senior Oceania Weightlifting Championship 2015. Participated in the Junior Oceania Weightlifting Championship 2015. Participated in the Youth Oceania Weightlifting Championship 2015.
 Ela Lupeni

Men
 Manuila Raobu - Participated in the Senior Oceania Weightlifting Championship 2015. Participated in the Junior Oceania Weightlifting Championship 2015 (Snatch 56 kg Male - best 65 kg - placed 5th) (Clean and Jerk 56 kg Male - best 77 kg - placed 6th) (TOTAL 142 kg - PLACED 6th) Participated in the Youth Oceania Weightlifting Championship 2015.
 Munua Tuau Lapua (Snatch 62 kg Male - best 75 kg - placed 5th) (Clean and Jerk 62 kg Male - best 106 kg - placed 4th) (TOTAL 181 kg - PLACED 4th) Participated in the Senior Oceania Weightlifting Championship 2015. He won the silver medal in his category in the Junior Oceania Weightlifting Championship 2015. 
 Logona Esau (Clean and Jerk 77 kg Male - best 145 kg - placed 4th) Participated in the Senior Oceania Weightlifting Championship 2015.
 Tavevele Noa (Snatch 77 kg Male - best 95 kg - placed 10th) (Clean and Jerk 77 kg Male - best 125 kg - placed 9th) (TOTAL 22O kg - PLACED 10th) Participated in the Senior Oceania Weightlifting Championship 2015.
 Tafaoata Tuau Lapua (Snatch 85 kg Male - best 100 kg - placed 8th equal) (Clean and Jerk 85 kg Male- best 128 kg - placed 11th) (TOTAL 228 kg - PLACED 11th) Participated in the Senior Oceania Weightlifting Championship 2015. He won the silver medal in his category in the Junior Oceania Weightlifting Championship 2015. 
 Lale Esau (disqualified on first day of weightlifting for being over weight in his category).
 Tuau Lapua Lapua (disqualified on first day of weightlifting for being over weight in his category).
 Teiloa Lotomahana (disqualified on first day of weightlifting for being under weight in his category).
 Isaia Takuya Nuese Temaka
 Vili Eliko

Notes

References

Pacific Games
Nations at the 2015 Pacific Games
2015